Lake Bustakh (Buustaax)  is a large freshwater lake in Ust-Yansky District, Sakha Republic, Russia.

Lake Bustakh freezes up in late September and stays icebound until June. It is rich in fish.

Geography
With an area of  it is one of the largest lakes of the Yana-Indigirka Lowland. The lake lies close to the Ebelyakh Bay of the Laptev Sea.

See also
List of lakes of Russia

References

Bustakh
East Siberian Lowland